Belligobio pengxianensis is a species of cyprinid fish endemic to China.  It is found in the Amur River.

References

  

Cyprinid fish of Asia
Belligobio
Freshwater fish of China
Fish described in 1977